Maxwell Powers (born December 27, 1983) is a Japanese voice actor born in the United States. Known for his work in Kabaneri of the Iron Fortress, Shinkansen Henkei Robo Shinkalion, Pokémon, and Ultraman Trigger: New Generation Tiga. Powers is also known for his live action work as the host of the NHK Educational TV program VocabRider (2016-present)
and as a host for NHK World-Japan's Catch Japan.  Most recently, Powers was a presenter at the 2020 Paralympic Games closing ceremony.

Early life
Powers began studying Japanese from the age of 15, and was awarded the Japanese Ministry of Education, Culture, Sports, Science and Technology's scholarship to attend a Japanese university in 2003. He began his professional career as a translator working in manga and anime.  In 2006, Powers was hired to supervise a narrator for a recording and was requested by the director to replace the original narrator.  After finishing the recording, the director encouraged Powers to pursue a career in narration and voice acting.

Career
Powers was cast in NHK Educational TV’s radio program Kiso Eigo as a host from 2007 until 2014.

In 2016, he was cast as the lead in NHK Educational TV’s television series, radio show, and smartphone application VocabRider. Co-starring Wakana Aoi, Minami Hamabe, Hiyori Sakurada, Powers was responsible for providing explanations of the English language in Japanese.  He has additionally worked as a reporter for NHK World's Catch Japan.

As a voice actor, he is primarily known for his work in Japanese anime and video games. Powers has played Suzuki in the television series, video game, and movie version of Kabaneri of the Iron Fortress (2016) and is the announcer in the movie Kuroko's Basketball The Movie: Last Game (2017).  Powers currently voices the recurring character Rotom Drone in the television series Pokémon, Sergeant Verde Buster Gundam in SD Gundam Heroes(2021), and Genbu in the Shinkansen Henkei Robo Shinkalion anime series Shinkalion(2018), Shinkalion Z(2021) and Shinkalion the Movie(2019). 

He also voices the characters of Ultraman Max and Ultraman Mebius in the live action movie Ultraman Ultra Galaxy Fight The Absolute Conspiracy(2020), and the transformation system voice in the television series Ultraman Trigger New Generation Tiga(2021).

Powers has also worked as an MC for various MMA tournaments from 2009 including World Victory Road's Sengoku Raiden Championship (SRC) and for Aniplex Online Fest. Recently he presented at the 2020 Paralympic Games closing ceremony.

In 2021, Powers joined the cast of the Amazon Prime Video on-demand series The Benza in the recurring role of Max.

Filmography

Television

Film

Video Games

References

External links
  

1983 births
Living people
American expatriates in Japan	
American television personalities	
Expatriate television personalities in Japan
Japanese entertainers	
Japanese male video game actors
Japanese male voice actors
Japanese television presenters	
Male actors from Oakland, California